Idukki State assembly constituency is one of the 140 state legislative assembly constituencies in Kerala state in southern India. It is also one of the 7 state legislative assembly constituencies included in the Idukki Lok Sabha constituency. As of the 2016 assembly elections, the current MLA is Roshy Augustine of KC(M).

Local self governed segments
Idukki Niyamasabha constituency is composed of the following local self-governed segments:

Members of Legislative Assembly 
The following list contains all members of Kerala legislative assembly who have represented the constituency:

Key

Election results 
Percentage change (±%) denotes the change in the number of votes from the immediately previous election.

Niyamasabha Election 2016 
There were 1,84,218 registered voters in the constituency for the 2016 Kerala Niyamasabha Election.

Niyamasabha Election 2011 
There were 1,69,984 registered voters in the constituency for the 2011 election.

See also
 Kattappana
 Idukki district
 List of constituencies of the Kerala Legislative Assembly
 2016 Kerala Legislative Assembly election

References

Assembly constituencies of Kerala
State assembly constituencies in Idukki district